Grand Ayatollah Sayyid Yousef Madani Tabrizi (1928-16 June 2013) (in Persian السيد يوسف مدنی تبریزی ) was an Iranian Twelver Shi'a Marja.

He studied in seminaries of Qum, Iran under Grand Ayatollah Seyyed Hossein Borujerdi and Muhammad Husayn Tabatabaei. He is the author of many Islamic books.

He died due to old age on 16 June 2013.

See also
List of Maraji

Notes

External links
website

Iranian Islamists
Shia Islamists
1928 births
2013 deaths